Ceryx fulvescens is a moth in the subfamily Arctiinae. It was described by Francis Walker in 1854. It is found in the Republic of the Congo, the Democratic Republic of the Congo, Kenya, Lesotho, Mozambique, Rwanda, Somalia, South Africa, Zambia and Zimbabwe.

References

Moths described in 1854
Arctiinae